Luciano del Castillo (born 23 June 1960, Palermo) is an Italian photographer and journalist specializing in war photography.

Biography
Castillo started working in 1980 as a photojournalist in Palermo for daily newspaper L'Ora and the agency Informazione fotografica by Letizia Battaglia and Franco Zecchin. In 1987, Castillo collaborated for "Action Press" in Hamburg on issues in Eastern European nations such as Romania, Poland, Hungary, and Yugoslavia. In 1986 and also from 1994 to 1996, he realized monographic dossiers for Iberian television TV3.

In 1994 in Rome, he worked for the national newspapers and magazines Il Corriere della Sera, la Repubblica, Il Messaggero, La Stampa, L'Unità, Avvenire, Panorama, L'Espresso, Famiglia Cristiana, and Diario, along with the international magazines and newspapers The Boston Globe, The Guardian, The Washington Post, International Herald Tribune, El País, La Vanguardia, El Tiempo, El Mundo, The Australian, and Der Spiegel.

From 1995 to April 2002, he worked for Agenzia Nazionale Stampa Associata (a.k.a. ANSA), an Italian news Agency in Rome. From June 2002 to January 2004, worked for the Associated Press in Rome. He has been working for ANSA since December 2005.

He was a speaker at a conference on the role of photography in war zones; the conference was organized by the Italian Foundation of Photography and took place in Turin in April 2002. In 2002, he published a dossier on the dangers of being a war reporter for weekly magazine Diario.

From 2002 to the end of 2005, he worked mainly abroad in areas of conflict, including for the Italian Department of Civil Defense for missions carried out in countries affected by natural disasters. Assignments he attended to were for an earthquake in Bam, Iran; an earthquake in Al Hoceima, Morocco; and the 2004 tsunami in Sri Lanka.

In 2005, he published a dossier from Nasiriya, Iraq titled "Brigata Combat Camera" in the weekly magazine L'Espresso.

Castillo has collaborated, along with Professor Luigi Goglia, with the faculty of history of journalism and mass communication at Università degli Studi Roma Tre.

Castillo was a teacher at the annual course for journalists working in areas of crisis, organized by the Ministry of Defense and in collaboration with the Federazione Nazionale Stampa Italiana.

In 2008, he contributed to the publication of the Palestinian magazine "Wameed"

Exhibitions

Dalla luna al vento (cf. lagazzettanizzena.it),  School Library Institute ITCG Mario Rapisardi, February 2015, CaltanissettaVentanas   (cf. prensa-latina.cu), (Noviembre Fotográfico cf. fototecadecuba.com), Casa del Alba Cultural, November 2013, The Havana, CubaGrida Silenziose  on Tsunami in Sri Lanka, Provincia di Roma, January- February 2005, RomeA proposito di Est  (Fotografia Festival di Roma cf. edizioni.fotografiafestival.it), April 2005, RomeDanni collaterali  (cf. corriere.it) March 2007, RomeSuggestioni  (Fotografia Festival di Roma, archiviostorico.corriere.it,  cf. edizioni.fotografiafestival.it), May - June 2007, RomeCon il cuore negli occhi (Reggio Photo Fest, 2008;,  cf. repubblica.it)I volti della crisi (cf. regione.toscana.it) agosto 2009, Marciana Marina, Isola d'ElbaSe la guerra è civile (cf. repubblica.it, cf. ecodisicilia.com), February 2010, PalermoMicrocosmos XV Italian Culture week in Cuba (cf. ansa.it),, (cf. amblavana.esteri.it),   November 26 - December 2, 2012, Havana, Cuba

Publications

 Cover photo: L'Italia degli anni di fango (cf. ibs.it), Indro Montanelli, Mario Cervi, Rizzoli 1993
 Cover photo: Editoriali (cf. bonannoeditore.com), Pierluigi Diaco e Alessandro Curzi, Bonanno editore 1993
 Cover photo: Una vita, una speranza: Antonino Caponnetto (cf. bonannoeditore.com), a cura di Pierluigi Diaco e Roberto Pavone, Bonanno editore 1993
 Cover photo: Curzi: il mestiere di giornalista, una conversazione , Pierluigi Diaco e Alessandro Curzi, Transeuropa editrice 1995
 Cover photo: El ultimo nazi (Priebke de la Argentina a Italia juicio a medio siglo de historia), (cf. abebooks.com), Elena Llorente e Martino Rigacci, Editorial Sudamericana, Barcelona, 1998
 Genoa. White Book, Ed. Genoa Social Forum in collaboration with "L’Unità", "Liberazione", il manifesto, 2001
 The path of movement. From Seattle to Porto Alegre in 2003 to one hundred million to the streets to the peace, (cf. www.intramoenia.it), AA. VV. Ed. Carta Intra Moenia, 2003Pope Pius XII and the Holocaust, John Roth, Carol Rittner, Ed. Continuum, 2004Rapporto sulle attività internazionali 2002-2006 (cf. protezionecivile.it), edited by Italian Department of Civil Defense, 2006Il cinema e il caso Moro, Francesco Ventura Ed. Le Mani-Microart'S, 2008
 Sri Lanka, il rendiconto (cf. protezionecivile.it), edited by Italian Department of Civil Defense, 2008
 Cover photo: Еще один круг на карусели - One More Ride on the Merry-go-round,(cf. slovo-online.ru), Tiziano Terzani, Russian edition, Slovo Publisher, Moscow, 2009
 Don Vito. Le relazioni segrete tra Stato e mafia nel racconto di un testimone d'eccezione, Massimo Ciancimino e Francesco la Licata, (cf. lafeltrinelli.it), 2010;
 La città cosmopolita. 1 Geografie dell'ascolto, Vincenzo Guarrasi (cf. palumboeditore.it), 2012
 Eccellenza italiana,  Cristina Palumbo Crocco (vd. rubbettinoeditore.it), 2012;
 Poesía escondida - La Habana - Cuba, Luciano del Castillo  (cf. Tempesta editore) (cf. Ansa.it), (cf. fotoup.net), (cf. amblavana.esteri.it), 2012
 Nord Meridiano,  Francesco De Filippo, Maria Frega (cf. Editori Internazionali Riuniti), 2014
 Dalla luna al vento, donne nelle fotografie di Luciano del Castillo'', Luciano del Castillo  (cf. Tempesta editore), (cf Ansa.it), (cf. repubblica.it), 2014

References

External links
 Official website 
  L.d.C. on fotoup.net

1960 births
Italian photojournalists
Living people
Photographers from Palermo